Vågberg is a Norwegian surname. Notable people with the surname include:

Lars Vågberg (born 1967), Norwegian curler
Magnus Vågberg, Norwegian curler
Trine Trulsen Vågberg (born 1962), Norwegian curler, wife of Lars

Norwegian-language surnames